26th Reconnaissance Squadron may refer to:
 The 416th Flight Test Squadron, constituted as the 26th Reconnaissance Squadron (Heavy) in January 1942 but redesignated 416th Bombardment Squadron( Heavy) before activation
 The 26th Tactical Missile Squadron, designated the 26th Reconnaissance Squadron (Fighter) from April 1943 to August 1943. 
 The 681st Bombardment Squadron, designated the 26th Reconnaissance Squadron, Very Long Range (Photographic - Radar Countermeasures) from August 1947 to June 1949

See also
 The 26th Photographic Reconnaissance Squadron
 The 26th Strategic Reconnaissance Squadron
 The 26th Tactical Reconnaissance Squadron